Alcohol most commonly refers to:
 Alcohol (chemistry), an organic compound in which a hydroxyl group is bound to a carbon atom
 Alcohol (drug), an intoxicant found in alcoholic drinks

Alcohol may also refer to:

Chemicals
 Ethanol, one of several alcohols, commonly known as alcohol in everyday life
 Alcoholic beverage, sometimes referred to as "alcohol", any drink containing ethanol
 Surrogate alcohol, any substance containing ethanol that is intentionally consumed by humans but is not meant for human consumption
 Methanol, a commodity chemical that can serve as a precursor to other chemicals
 Alcohol fuel, a fuel containing alcohols
 Alcohol powder, a powdered form of alcohol
 Fusel alcohol, a mixture of several alcohols (chiefly amyl alcohol) produced as a by-product of alcoholic fermentation.
 Alcohols (medicine), the use of alcohols in medicine
 Rubbing alcohol, a solution of denatured or isopropyl alcohol used in medicine

Music
 "Alcohol" (Barenaked Ladies song), a song by Barenaked Ladies from their album Stunt
 "Alcohol" (Brad Paisley song), a song by Brad Paisley from his album Time Well Wasted
 "Alcohol" (CSS song), a song by CSS from their album Cansei de Ser Sexy
 "Alcohol", a song by the Butthole Surfers from the album Independent Worm Saloon
 "Alcohol", a song by Gang Green from the album Another Wasted Night
 "Alcohol", a song by Gogol Bordello from the album Super Taranta!
 "Alcohol", a song by the Kinks on their albums Muswell Hillbillies and Everybody's in Show-Biz
 "Alcohol", a song by Millionaires from the EP Bling Bling Bling!
 "Alcohol", a song by Terminaator from the album Lõputu päev
 "Alcohol", a song by British street punk band Charged GBH
 "Alcohol", a song by Beck from the Loser single
 "Alkohol", a song by Herbert Grönemeyer from the album 4630 Bochum

Other uses
 Alcohol (horse), an Australian racehorse
 Alcohol (journal), a peer-reviewed medical journal

See also
 Alkohol, a 1919 German silent drama film
 Alcohol 120%, an optical disc authoring program and disk image emulator created by Alcohol Soft